Blonay - Saint-Légier is a municipality in the district of Riviera-Pays-d'Enhaut in the canton of Vaud in Switzerland. It was established on 1 January 2022 with the merger of the municipalities of Blonay and Saint-Légier-La Chiésaz.

History
Blonay was first mentioned in 861 as Blodennaco.  In 1108 it was mentioned as Bloniaco.  During the 13th century it was known as Blonay, Blonai and Blunai. Saint-Légier-La Chiésaz was first mentioned in 1228 as Sanctus Leodegarus. On 1 January 2022 the former municipalities of Blonay and Saint-Légier-La Chiésaz merged into the new municipality of Blonay - Saint-Légier.

References

External links 
 The website of Blonay - Saint-Légier.

Municipalities of the canton of Vaud
2022 establishments in Switzerland
States and territories established in 2022